William Cullen Rankin (8 August 1898 – 17 August 1967) was a Canadian boxer. He competed in the men's featherweight event at the 1920 Summer Olympics, where he lost to Wim Hesterman of the Netherlands.

References

1898 births
1967 deaths
Canadian male boxers
Olympic boxers of Canada
Boxers at the 1920 Summer Olympics
Sportspeople from Kirkintilloch
Sportspeople from Edmonton
Scottish emigrants to Canada
Featherweight boxers
Naturalized citizens of the United States